National Gateway is a multi-stage railroad construction project in the United States promoted by CSX Transportation, a unit of CSX Corporation. It is designed to improve rail connections between ports in the U.S. mid-Atlantic seaboard and the Midwest by upgrading bridges and tunnels to allow taller freight trains (ones carrying double-stack intermodal containers). In 2008 the company announced its plans to invest $300 million, and is seeking investment from state governments and the U.S. federal government of an additional $400 million as a public-private partnership. Phase 1 of the $850 million project, between CSX's existing terminal in Chambersburg, Pennsylvania, and its hub facility in Northwest Ohio. was completed in September 2013.

Unrelated project
An unrelated project with the same name was founded in 2001 as an engineering test between global communication networks.

Completed railway improvement projects
 Northwest Ohio Intermodal Terminal in North Baltimore, Ohio. Funded completely by CSX. Opened February 2011. A number of tunnels were open cut for the project including:
 Shoo Fly Tunnel (2012)
 Pinkerton Tunnel (2012)
 Benford Tunnel (2012)
 Virginia Avenue Tunnel in Washington, DC (2018). Tunnel rebuilt using cut-and-cover to double track and allow for double-stacked containers.

Projects under construction or funded
 Rail corridor parallel to Interstate 70 and Interstate 76 between Washington, D.C. and northwest Ohio, via Pittsburgh. Federal funding approved in December 2010.
 Lowering track on the Capital Subdivision in Maryland.
 Replacing bridges and modifying tunnels on the Metropolitan Subdivision in Maryland.

Proposed projects
 Rail corridor parallel to Interstate 95 between North Carolina and Baltimore, via Washington, D.C.
 Lowering track and modifying the Long Bridge on the RF&P Subdivision in Washington
 Replacing a bridge on the RF&P Subdivision in Woodbridge, Virginia
 Washington, D.C. - Ohio rail corridor
 New intermodal terminal in western Pennsylvania.
 New intermodal rail yard in Columbus, Ohio.
 Carolina Corridor between Wilmington and Charlotte

See also
 National Docks Secondary and Long Dock Tunnel
 List of CSX Transportation lines
 Heartland Corridor – Norfolk Southern Railway improvement project
 Norfolk Southern Crescent Corridor
 Virginia Port Authority
 Transportation Investment Generating Economic Recovery, a stimulus program providing some of the funding
 MidAmerica Corridor

References

 
 
 
 Maryland Department of Transportation, Hanover, MD (2008). "Maryland Freight Project List - Rail." Accessed 2009-12-05.
 Metropolitan Washington Council of Governments, Washington, DC (2009). "CSX National Gateway Projects in the Washington Region." Accessed 2009-12-05.

External links
 National Gateway - Official site of National Gateway, a CSX Transportation project
 National Gateway page at Ohio DOT TIGER grants

CSX Transportation
Rail infrastructure in Maryland
Rail infrastructure in North Carolina
Rail infrastructure in Ohio
Rail infrastructure in Pennsylvania
Rail infrastructure in South Carolina
Rail infrastructure in Virginia
Rail infrastructure in Washington, D.C.
Rail infrastructure in West Virginia
Rail freight transportation in the United States
Transportation planning